CTV Drama Channel (formerly known as Bravo) is a Canadian English language discretionary specialty channel owned by Bell Media.

The channel was founded as the Canadian version of the U.S. channel Bravo (which is now owned by NBCUniversal) on January 1, 1995 by Moses Znaimer and its owner CHUM Limited, and originally focused on performing arts, drama, and independent film. As with its U.S. counterpart, the channel has dropped its arts programming but unlike its U.S. counterpart, which shifted to female-targeting reality and lifestyle-oriented series, the Canadian channel adopted a general entertainment format with a focus on drama.

In 2007, Bravo was among the channels acquired by CTVglobemedia after buying the assets of CHUM Limited. The channel was relaunched in 2012 under a new logo and separate branding from its former American counterpart. Seven years later, the channel would rebrand again under its current name on September 12, 2019.

History
In the 1980s, a precursor to Bravo existed called C Channel. The service was boasted as a national commercial-free pay television channel that focused on arts programming. C Channel launched on February 1, 1983, before it went bankrupt and ceased operations five months later on June 30 of that year due to its inability to attract a sufficient number of subscribers at a price of $16 per month.

Over 10 years later, another attempt at an arts-based channel was proposed when CHUM Limited applied to the Canadian Radio-television and Telecommunications Commission (CRTC) for a license to operate Bravo. In June 1994, CHUM's application for Bravo was approved, citing its nature of service as focusing on "performance and drama programming, as well as documentary and discussion".

Bravo was launched on January 1, 1995, licensing the name from Rainbow Media (now known as AMC Networks), who partnered with CHUM to launch MuchMusic USA (later known as Fuse TV).

Sale to CTVglobemedia/Bell Media

In July 2006, Bell Globemedia (later called CTVglobemedia) announced that it would purchase CHUM for an estimated CAD$1.7 billion, included in the sale was Bravo The sale was approved by the CRTC on June 8, 2007, and the transaction was completed on June 22, 2007 while the Citytv stations were sold to Rogers Media. After CTVglobemedia's purchase of Bravo, the channel increasingly shifted its focus toward more television and film dramas (such as Criminal Minds), and lessened its focus on arts programming.

On September 10, 2010, BCE Inc. (a minority shareholder in CTVglobemedia) announced that it planned to acquire 100% interest in CTVglobemedia for a total debt and equity transaction cost of $3.2 billion. The deal was approved by the CRTC on March 7, 2011, and was finalized on April 1 of that year, on which CTVglobemedia was rebranded Bell Media. a high definition simulcast feed of Bravo, which broadcasts in the 1080i resolution format, was launched later that year on October 6, 2011.

While under Bell Media ownership, Bravo unveiled a new on-air logo and new on-air presentation in 2012, as part of an extensive rebranding of the network.

On June 6, 2013, Bell announced that Bravo would become the company's first network to implement a TV Everywhere service, which would allow subscribers of participating television service providers that carry Bravo to stream video on demand content as well as a live feed of the Bravo channel via the Bravo Go app.

On June 7, 2018, it was announced that Bravo would be re-branded as "CTV Drama", as part of a re-branding of several Bell Media specialty channels under the CTV name. The following year, it was revealed the channel would rebrand as CTV Drama Channel on September 12, 2019. Bell also announced a commitment to order 20 made-for-TV film adaptations of Harlequin novels from Harlequin Studios, which will air on CTV Drama Channel and Vrak.

Programming
Presently, CTV Drama Channel airs a mix of programming from American cable and broadcast networks, as well as reruns of Canadian-produced shows to fulfill Canadian content quotas.

In its early years as Bravo, the channel often aired short films by Canadian artists between programs, funded by its foundation Bravo!FACT, which ranged from comedy to drama to opera to jazz to animation. Many of these also aired on Bravo's weekly series Bravo!FACT Presents. Bravo has also produced a limited amount of scripted and non-scripted series and has broadcast many notable specials, including a telecast of Canadian rock band Spirit of the West's Open Heart Symphony concert with the Vancouver Symphony Orchestra, and three early television films within the Murdoch Mysteries franchise: Except the Dying, Poor Tom Is Cold and Under the Dragon's Tail.

As CTV Drama Channel

Current programming

 Animal Kingdom
 Bones
 The Closer
 Chicago Fire
 Chicago Med
 Chicago P.D.
 Claws
 CSI: Crime Scene Investigation
 Flashpoint
 The Handmaid's Tale
 In the Dark
 Killing Eve
 Fear Thy Neighbor
 Station Eleven
 Walker

As Bravo
 Arts & Minds
 At the Concert Hall
 Bravo! Videos
 Bravo!FACT Presents
 Bravo!NEWS
Except the Dying
Law & Order
 Live at the Rehearsal Hall
 19-2
Odd Job Jack
Open Heart Symphony
 The O'Regan Files
 Playlist
 The People's Couch
Poor Tom Is Cold
 Star Portraits
Under the Dragon's Tail

References

External links
 

 
Analog cable television networks in Canada
CTV Television Network
Bell Media networks
Television channels and stations established in 1995
English-language television stations in Canada
1995 establishments in Canada